David Huggins Wallace (born October 17, 1979 in Brentwood, Tennessee), is a former American professional baseball catcher. He was the manager of the Eastern Leagues's Akron RubberDucks, the AA level minor-league affiliate of then Cleveland Indians.  He was also the catching coordinator within then Indians system.

From 1998 to 2000, Wallace was a two-sport athlete at Vanderbilt University, playing both football, as a backup quarterback, and baseball, as a catcher.  Wallace decided to concentrate on baseball in 2001, and did not play football.  From 2002 to 2008, Wallace played in Minor League Baseball with the Mahoning Valley Scrappers, Lake County Captains, Kinston Indians, Akron Aeros, Buffalo Bisons all within the then Cleveland Indians' farm system. He also played for the Columbus Clippers then affiliated with the Washington Nationals.

External links

References

1979 births
Living people
Akron Aeros players
Kinston Indians players
Lake County Captains players
Mahoning Valley Scrappers players
Buffalo Bisons (minor league) players
Columbus Clippers players
Vanderbilt Commodores baseball players
Major League Baseball coaches
Lake County Captains managers